The state of Ohio is home to a number of public and private institutions of higher learning. Prior to statehood, the Northwest Ordinance of 1787 included a provision to establish an institution of higher education in what became Ohio. American Western University was chartered in 1802 as a result, but never opened. Two years later, the new Ohio General Assembly chartered Ohio University, which opened for classes in 1809, followed by Miami University, which was chartered in 1809 and opened in 1824.  In northern Ohio, Western Reserve College (now Case Western Reserve University) was established in 1826.

The Ohio Board of Regents oversees the public institutions of higher education in Ohio. This system has come under some criticism in recent years as contributing greatly to overlap and redundancies in the higher education system. For example, Ohio's public university system supports nine doctoral programs in history and five law schools while four different public universities in Ohio operate airports and offer aviation programs. At the same time, the system has been lauded for creating powerful "utility" organizations, such as OhioLINK and the Ohio Supercomputer Center, which allow campuses to collaborate and achieve significant efficiencies. A new credit transfer program makes transferring among Ohio's public campuses much easier, and allows students to preview academic programs.

11 of the 14 public universities top the state's enrollment statistics. The remaining three public institutions—Shawnee State University, Central State University and Northeast Ohio Medical University—are relatively small.  Case Western Reserve University is the state's largest private university by enrollment, followed by the University of Dayton, Xavier University, Franklin University, Ashland University, and University of Findlay.

Institutions

Defunct institutions

See also 

 Higher education in the United States
 List of American institutions of higher education
 List of college athletic programs in Ohio
 List of recognized higher education accreditation organizations
 Lists of universities and colleges
 List of colleges and universities by country

References

External links 
Department of Education listing of accredited institutions in Ohio

Ohio

Colleges